USS Harold C. Thomas (DE-21) was an  constructed for the United States Navy during World War II. It was promptly sent off into the Pacific Ocean to protect convoys and other ships from Japanese submarines and fighter aircraft. At the end of the war, she returned to the United States with two battle stars.
 
She was launched on 18 December 1942 by the Mare Island Naval Shipyard, Vallejo, California, as HMS Essington (BDE-21) for the British Royal Navy; later designated for U.S. Navy use; and commissioned on 31 May 1943.

Namesake
Harold Chester Tomas was born on 7 May 1907 in Gleo, Oklahoma. He enlisted in the Navy on 28 January 1927. He was appointed Carpenter on 8 February 1933 and served on various ships and at Cavite Naval Yard before being commissioned Chief Carpenter 24 March 1939. During the Battle of Cape Esperance, 11–12 October 1942, Boise was badly hit by Imperial Japanese Navy gunfire. He was killed while working with damage control parties to keep his ship in the battle, and was posthumously awarded the Navy Cross.

World War II Pacific Theatre operations 
After three voyages escorting merchantmen from San Francisco, California, to Pearl Harbor, Harold C. Thomas served with ComSubTraPac from 2 to 20 November 1943. Sailing from Pearl Harbor on 20 November with a convoy of merchantmen and cargo ships, she reached Abemama, Gilbert Islands, on 28 November, a week after Vice Admiral Raymond A. Spruance began the occupation of those islands. Harold C. Thomas spent the rest of the year in the Gilberts on patrol and escort duty.
 
After undergoing availability early in 1944, Harold C. Thomas sailed as flagship for Escort Division 10, on 29 February. Reaching Eniwetok, Marshall Islands, on 11 March, she did escort work until 30 March when she became part of a hunter-killer carrier group on anti-submarine patrol east of the Marshalls. Returning to Pearl Harbor on 6 May, the destroyer escort spent the remainder of the year in the vital but unsung work of shepherding merchantmen, cargo ships, and transports through the back staging area, up to their assembly points for invasion forces. This duty took Harold C. Thomas to the Marshall, Admiralty, Palau, and Marianas Islands. She also performed some submarine training work at Pearl Harbor. On 21 November Harold C. Thomas rescued seven men from a PBM flying boat which had crashed at sea off Majuro Atoll.
 
Departing Pearl Harbor on 21 January 1945, she reached San Francisco, California, six days later and proceeded to San Diego, California, for badly needed repairs. Harold C. Thomas returned to Pearl Harbor on 5 April and spent the rest of the war in submarine training and escort duty.

Attending the signing at Tokyo Bay 
The long Pacific war ended on 1 September with the signing of the unconditional surrender on board  in Tokyo Bay, and Harold C. Thomas sailed for the United States 20 days later, putting into San Pedro, Los Angeles, on 27 September.

End-of-War Decommissioning 
She decommissioned on 26 October 1945. She was sold to the Pacific Bridge Co., San Francisco, California, on 25 November 1946 and was scrapped on 26 March 1947.

Awards

References

External links
 

Evarts-class destroyer escorts
World War II frigates and destroyer escorts of the United States
Ships built in Vallejo, California
1942 ships